The MOWAG Tornado is an armored Infantry fighting vehicle of the company Mowag from Switzerland.

The engine is located in the bow, the driver is on the right side and directly behind him the commander, the armored infantry troops leave the vehicle through a rear door, there is a certain resemblance to the Soviet BMP-1. Different versions of the Tornado with various weapons were tested. The last version was built in 1980. There was never a serial production. The Tornado has an AC air safety system fitted and an automatic fire detection and extinguishing system fitted in the engine compartment. Also the use of SNORA and SURA-D rockets as main weapons was possible. A MOWAG Tornado is part of the Schweizerisches Militärmuseum Full.

References 

Armoured fighting vehicles of Switzerland
Abandoned military projects of Switzerland